Jing Yidan (born 27 April 1955) is a former Chinese host. She won China's Golden Mike Award in 1993, 1995 and 1997. She is the vice president of the China Association of Radio and Television and was a delegate to the 9th National People's Congress.

Biography
Jing Yidan was born in April 1955 in Harbin, Heilongjiang. During the Down to the Countryside Movement, she worked in countryside as a Sent-down youth. After the Cultural Revolution, she returned to Heilongjiang. After graduating from Communication University of China in 1979 she was assigned to Long Guang as a news anchor.

Jing Yidan joined the China Central Television in 1988, she hosted Focus Report and Oriental Horizon.

Works

Television
 Focus Report
 Oriental Horizon

Awards
 1993 Golden Mike Award
 1995 Golden Mike Award
 1997 Golden Mike Award

Personal life
In October 1985, Jing Yidan was married to Wang Zimu, who was a graduate of Tsinghua University.

References

External links

1955 births
Politicians from Harbin
Communication University of China alumni
Living people
Chinese radio presenters
Chinese women radio presenters
Chinese television presenters
Chinese women television presenters
Chinese women journalists
CCTV newsreaders and journalists
People's Republic of China politicians from Heilongjiang